John Brownlow may refer to:

Sir John Brownlow, 1st Baronet (c. 1595–1678) of the Brownlow baronets
Sir John Brownlow, 3rd Baronet (1659–1697)
John Brownlow, 1st Viscount Tyrconnel (1690–1754)
John Brownlow (Dean of Clonmacnoise) (1805–1882), Irish Anglican priest

See also
Brownlow (surname)